Hodges Hill is a mountain located in the Catskill Mountains of New York southwest of Franklin. Gallop Hill is located south-southeast and Wheat Hill is located north of Hodges Hill.

References

Mountains of Delaware County, New York
Mountains of New York (state)